Fraj ben Abdallah Bnouni (born June 22, 1979) is a Tunisian footballer. His position is a midfielder. He measures 1.76 metres, and weighs 73 kilograms.

Bnouni moved to Libyan side Ahly Benghazi in summer of 2009, after spells with US Monastir and CS Sfaxien.

References

1979 births
Living people
Tunisian footballers
Expatriate footballers in Libya
US Monastir (football) players
CS Sfaxien players
Tunisian expatriate sportspeople in Libya
Association football midfielders
Tunisian expatriate footballers